The Megalithic European: The 21st Century Traveller in Prehistoric Europe (2004) is Julian Cope's second book on historic sites, this time looking at continental Europe and Ireland. Like its predecessor—The Modern Antiquarian—the book is split into a shorter, discursive introduction with the bulk of the text being a gazetteer of sites. As with The Modern Antiquarian, sites are listed alphabetically within their sections.

See also
 Megalith
 Neolithic Europe
 Dolmen
 Stone Circles

References

External links
 The Modern Antiquarian

2004 non-fiction books
Archaeology books
Books by Julian Cope
Megalithic monuments in Europe